Valiha is a bamboo genus in the tribe Bambuseae found in Madagascar. The genus is named after a musical instrument, the valiha, which was formerly constructed from the culms of this plant.

References

External links

Bambusoideae genera
 
Endemic flora of Madagascar